Henry Eyring may refer to:

Henry Eyring (chemist) (1901–1981), Mexican-born American theoretical chemist
Henry Eyring (Mormon pioneer) (1835–1902), German Mormon convert and emigrant to the U.S., then Mexico
Henry B. Eyring (born 1933), American academic and leader in The Church of Jesus Christ of Latter-day Saints
Henry J. Eyring (born 1963), American university administrator